Gao Village Arc an arc featured within Wu Cheng'en's Journey to the West. This arc takes place generally during chapter 18 – 19 in this novel. Within this article, characters, conflicts, and external phrases shall be elaborated on as to provide a full summary of this arc.

Village summary

Gao Village is a village that remains rather near to the main Tang dynasty—thus being within China. Around chapter 18, Sanzang and Sun Wukong would arrive at this seemingly small village. Gao Village is run by an old man named Square Gao and his hard working villagers. This village is reputed for its amount of vegetarian food – as seen with Zhu Bajie, Square Gao's son-in-law. After Bajie is effectively subdued by Wukong due to his exceedingly gluttonous and lustful ways, this village's overall provisional production rises to a large margin. Sanzang, Wukong, and his new disciple all soon leave this village and continue their journey westward. This village would not be shown again following Bajie's subjugation during chapter 19.

Featured characters

Lady Gao
Lady Gao is the daughter of Square Gao, a man seen as the head of Gao Village. Lady Gao is the last woman who would have to suffer ill treatment by the sex crazed pig, Zhu Bajie—a later disciple of Sanzang. At some point, Square Gao had insisted for his daughter to be rescued. After Pig is asleep and the lady is sitting inside their worn-out barn-like area, Wukong retrieves Lady Gao. Through her appearance, this is what could be seen:

Her cloudy hair was tangled and unkempt,
Her face was filthy and unwashed.
Her orchid heart was as pure as ever,
But her beauty lay in ruins.There was no blood or life in her cherry lips,And her limbs were crooked and bent.A sad frown on her forehead,Her eyebrows pale;Weak and frightened,Only daring to whisper.

Following this, Lady Gao reveals the truth about Pig—he leaves during the night and appears at dawn in fear of her father exorcising him. Thus, the lady is retrieved to her father with relative ease. Sun Wukong himself would afterwards copy her appearance and play in her role while with Pig. After Sanzang, Pig, and Wukong all leave on their journey after a major event, Lady Gao truly gives her expression of thanks and is never shown again afterwards.
Square Gao
Square Gao is the head of Gao Village, in which he is always complaining about his son-in-law. This son-in-law of his happens to be Zhu Bajie, a sex crazed pig. Zhu Bajie had forced Square Gao his son-in-law so that he could attain his daughter as his own wife. As later seen, Bajie eats up all the food that Square Gao has as his daughter's "husband". After Sanzang and Wukong arrive to this village, Square Gao immediately appears before them and pleads for a request to rescue his daughter. After Wukong is in the process of rescuing his daughter, Square Gao effectively calls out his daughter's name and she is effectively saved. After the whole issue is resolved, Square Gao awards Wukong and Sanzang greatly with a banquet and expresses his utmost thanks. After this arc, Square Gao is never shown again at any point.

'''Zhu Bajie – see main article

Conflicts/Battles

Overall in this arc, Zhu Bajie would battle it out against Sun Wukong atop a mountain slope at the time of night—a neighboring mountain of Gao Village. After this battle rages on for many days and there are varied retreats, Wukong eventually talks with the Bodhisattva Guanyin about this issue. After Wukong tells Zhu Bajie what she had told him, Pig joins Sanzang and Wukong as promised to the compassionate Guanyin. Wukong doesn't trust Pig easily and pulls him by the hair saying "even a good pig must be handled roughly."

Poems

Here is a poem that proves Zhu Bajie's consent to join Sanzang and Wukong in their journey to attain the scriptures:

The Golden Vajra is stronger than Wood,
The Mind Ape could bring the Wooden Dragon to submission.
When Metal obeyed and Wood was tamed they were at one;
When Wood was loving and Metal kind they worked together.
One host and one guest with nothing to keep them apart,
With the three in harmony they had a mysterious power.
Nature and feelings both rejoiced as they joined in the Supreme Principle;
They both promised without reservation to go to the West.
'Zhu Bajie – see main article

References

 Journey to the West chapter 18–19 – Wu Cheng-en

Chinese literature